Bine, also known as Pine, Kunini, Masingara or Oriomo (a name shared with Wipi), is a Papuan language of New Guinea. Glottolog lists the following varieties: Boze-Giringarede, Irupi-Drageli, Kunini, Masingle, Sebe, Sogal and Tate.

References

Eastern Trans-Fly languages
Torres Strait
Languages of Western Province (Papua New Guinea)